Trinity Methodist Church is a historic church at 237 N. Water Avenue in Idaho Falls, Idaho.  It was built during 1916 to 1917 and was added to the National Register in 1977.

It is a "massive rusticated stone structure in the Tudor-Gothic style."  It was built of stone quarried north of Heise.  It was asserted in its NRHP nomination that it "typifies the Tudor-Gothic style, with its lack of steeples and flattened arches over large stained glass windows with intricate tracery. Although the short towers, clerestory, and side aisles are symmetrically placed, a Sunday school wing on the north and an octagonal tower on the southwest corner create a feeling of picturesque irregularity. Stone buttresses and pilasters provide the vertical thrust in the design."

A Sunday School wing was added in 1948.

References

Methodist churches in Idaho
Churches on the National Register of Historic Places in Idaho
Churches completed in 1917
Buildings and structures in Bonneville County, Idaho
National Register of Historic Places in Bonneville County, Idaho
Churches in Bonneville County, Idaho
Buildings and structures in Idaho Falls, Idaho